Düsseldorf Airport Terminal (Düsseldorf Flughafen Terminal) is an underground station on the Rhine-Ruhr S-Bahn at the end of the Düsseldorf-Unterrath–Düsseldorf Airport Terminal railway, situated underneath Terminal C of Düsseldorf Airport, Düsseldorf in western Germany.  It is served by the S11 line.

The station was opened in 1975 and was served by S-Bahn line S 7 until 13 December 2009, when line S 7 was closed and S 11 was extended to Düsseldorf Airport Terminal station.

Notes

Railway stations in Düsseldorf
Railway stations located underground in Germany
Rhine-Ruhr S-Bahn stations
Airport railway stations in Germany
S11 (Rhine-Ruhr S-Bahn)
Düsseldorf Airport
Railway stations in Germany opened in 1975